The 2000 Democratic National Convention was a quadrennial presidential nominating convention for the Democratic Party. The convention nominated Vice President Al Gore for president and Senator Joe Lieberman from Connecticut for vice president. The convention was held at the Staples Center (now the Crypto.com Arena) in Los Angeles, California from August 14 to August 17, 2000. Gore accepted the presidential nomination on August 17, the final night of the convention.

Logistics

Site selection

The Democratic National Committee (DNC) initially invited 28 cities to bid for the convention. Nine cities submitted proposals, seven of which (Boston, Denver, Los Angeles, Miami, Minneapolis, New Orleans and Philadelphia) were visited by the DNC. Philadelphia withdrew its bid after being selected as the host of the 2000 Republican National Convention. Boston, Denver and Los Angeles were named as finalists. On March 15, 1999, the DNC announced Los Angeles as the site of the convention.

This was the second Democratic National Convention to be held in Los Angeles, with the first having been the 1960 convention.

Scheduling
Since the mid-20th century or earlier, it has been tradition for the party of the incumbent president to hold their convention after that of the other major party. In 2000, Republicans held their convention July 31 through August 3.

On April 16, 1999 Chair of the Democratic National Committee Joe Andrew announced that the convention would take place August 14–17.

Corporate partnerships
United Airlines was named the convention's "official airline" on August 19, 1999. AT&T served as the primary technology partner for the convention, as well as a lead corporate sponsor. Event411.com served as the "official event-planning provider" of the convention.

Security
At both the 2000 major party presidential nominating conventions, security was heightened compared to that of past conventions.

Crowd control security concerns were heightened at the Democratic convention due to a number of the organizations behind the activities of the 1999 Seattle WTO protests pledging to protest in Los Angeles during the convention. Also, still in recent memory, was the 1992 Los Angeles riots.

In the fall of 1999, the Democratic National Convention Committee established a security task force, bringing together the convention's logistics team, the Los Angeles Police Department, the Los Angeles Fire Department, the United States Secret Service, and other agencies of the federal, state, and municipal levels.

Ken Banner served as the convention's director of security.

Stage design
Per a Democratic National Convention Committee's press release, the stage of the convention was elevated five feet above the floor of the arena, was roughly 3,700 square feet in area (with the podium measuring 1,825 square feet, the orchestra measuring 1,225 square feet, and the camera turrets measuring 720 square feet), and had and had a 18x30 foot video screen.

The podium's lectern was able to be mechanically lowered beneath the stage, and the walls located behind both sides of the lectern could also be raised from on the stage.

The podium was painted with water-based non-toxic paint, with the colors being Red 199, Blue 300, TV White (Cool Gray #3), and Metal Effects platinum #ME222.

Rene Lagler, who had been the interior designer for the 1988, 1992, and 1996 conventions, designed the podium, in addition to designing the central camera platform and also working on both the convention's interior and exterior design.

Bob Dickenson served as the convention's lighting designer, and Batrick Baltzell served as its audio designer.

Convention leadership
Ron Gonzales and Blanche Lincoln served as co-chairs of the convention's credentials committee. Mary Landrieu and Gary Locke served as co-chairs of the convention's rules committee.

The co-chairs of the convention's platform committee were Sharon Sayles Belton and Dick Durbin. Its vice chairs included Bob Butterworth, James Hunt Jr., Jack Reed. Other members of the committee included Jim Davis and C. Jack Ellis, Eleanor Holmes Norton. The chair of the platform drafting committee had been James Hunt Jr. Members of the platform drafting committee included Bill Purcell.

Democratic National Convention Committee
On September 21, 1999, a number of members of the convention's leadership were announced. Lydia Camarillo was announced as the convention's chief executive officer (CEO). Donald J. Foley was announced as chief operating officer (COO) of the convention. Rod O'Connor was announced as the chief of staff for the convention. Jeff Modisett was announced as deputy CEO and general counsel for the convention. Katreice Banks was announced as deputy CEO for external affairs. Mona Pasquil was announced  as deputy CEO for community relations. It was also announced that Yolanda Caraway would consult with the conventions for external affairs, credentials, and productions. Jaci Wilson was announced as the convention's director of housing. Ofield Dukes was announced as one of the convention's communications consultants.

On September 23, 1999, Roy Romer was announced as chair of the Democratic National Convention Committee.

On December 9, 1999, additional convention staff were announced for the Democratic National Convention Committee. Anette Avina was announced as senior advisor to the CEO and director of special projects. Travis Berry was announced as senior advisor to the chairman and director of special projects. Simone M. Greene was announced as special assistant to the COO. Cindy M. Lott was announced as deputy general counsel. Liana Shwarz was announced as special assistant to the CEO. Lou Vasta was announced as director of  logistics and operations. Luis Vizcaino was announced as the DNCC's press secretary.

On February 23, 2000, the Democratic National Convention Committee announced three key members of its convention security task force. Ken Banner was announced as director of security. John Vezeris and Joseph A. Masonis were announced as managing directors of the task force.

On March 10, 2000, Brian L. Wickersham was announced as the Democratic National Convention Committee's director of transportation, and Jeffery Lowery was announced as its deputy director of transportation.

On April 27, 2000, the Democratic National Convention Committee's production team was announced. Gary Smith was announced as executive producer, Ricky Kirshner was announced as producer, and Thomas E. Gorman was announced as director of production.

Convention officers
Terry McAuliffe served as the chair of the convention.

Paul E. Patton served as one of the co-chairs of the convention.

Thurbert Baker, Steny Hoyer, Patty Judge, and John S. Tanner served as parliamentarians.

Official themes
Each day of the convention was assigned a theme. The first day's theme was "Prosperity and Progress", highlighting the economic progress that had occurred under the Clinton–Gore administration. The second day's theme was "New Heights: You Ain't Seen Nothing Yet", focusing on the potential of the future if proper decisions are carried out by new leadership. The third day's theme was "Al Gore: The Principled Fighter", highlighting Al Gore's life story. The closing day's theme was "Al Gore's vision for the future".

Balloting
Gore was nominated unanimously, and during the roll-call vote for president, Florida's delegation was given the honor of putting Gore over-the-top as the official nominee.

On the day before the convention started Bill Bradley released his delegates and directed them to vote for Gore. The votes of Bradley's delegates that wished to vote for him were registered as abstentions.
The Balloting:

Senator Joe Lieberman was nominated as the party's candidate for Vice President by voice vote.

Lieberman's formal nomination took place on the closing night of the convention, despite him having delivered his acceptance speech the previous night.

Notable speakers

The keynote speaker of the convention was Congressman Harold Ford Jr. of Tennessee.

The highlight of the first night of the convention was a speech given by President Bill Clinton.

Other notable speakers included Gore's opponent for the Democratic nomination, Senator Bill Bradley, First Lady Hillary Clinton, Senators Christopher Dodd of Connecticut and Ted Kennedy of Massachusetts, Former Treasury Secretary Robert Rubin, and the Reverend Jesse Jackson.

Actor Tommy Lee Jones, Gore's roommate in college, officially nominated the vice president.

Day 1
Joe Andrew, chair of the Democratic National Committee
Dennis Archer, mayor of Detroit
Barbara Boxer, United States senator from California
Joseph Cari Jr., national finance co-chair of the Democratic National Committee
Linda Chavez-Thompson, vice chair of the Democratic National Committee and executive vice president of the AFL–CIO
Bill Clinton, president of the United States
Hillary Clinton, first lady of the United States and Democratic nominee for United States Senate in New York
Michael B. Coleman, mayor of Columbus, Ohio
Gray Davis, governor of California
Judi Dutcher, Minnesota state auditor
Dianne Feinstein, United States senator from California
Ron Gonzales, mayor of San Jose
Steny Hoyer, United States congressman from Maryland
Joel Hyatt, national finance co-chair of the Democratic National Committee
Patrick J. Kennedy, United States congressman from Rhode Island
Mary Landrieu, United States senator from Louisiana
Blanche Lincoln, United States senator from Arkansas
Gary Locke, governor of Washington
Tim Leiweke, CEO and president of Anschutz Entertainment Group
Alexis Herman, United States secretary of labor
Roger Mahony, Roman Catholic archdiocese of Los Angeles (invocation)
Dannel Malloy, mayor of Stamford, Connecticut and chair of the National Democratic Municipal Officials Conference
Terry McAuliffe, chair of the convention
Joan Menard, member of the Massachusetts House of Representatives
Gloria Molina, member of the Los Angeles County Board of Supervisors
Marc Morial, mayor of New Orleans
Thomas V. Miller Jr., president of the Maryland Senate
Patty Murray, United States Senator from Washington
Bill Nelson, Florida insurance commissioner and nominee for United States Senate in Florida
Paul E. Patton, governor of Kentucky
Richard Riordan, mayor of Los Angeles
Lottie Shackelford, vice chair of the Democratic National Committee and former mayor of Little Rock, Arkansas
Jeanne Shaheen, governor of New Hampshire
Debbie Stabenow, United States congresswoman from Michigan and candidate for United States Senate in Michigan
Andrew Tobias, treasured of the Democratic National Committee
Robert Torricelli, United States Senator from New Jersey
Art Torres, chair of the California Democratic Party and former California state senator
Wellington Webb, mayor of Denver
Lynn Woolsey, United States congresswoman from California

Day 2
Joe Andrew, chair of the Democratic National Committee
Tammy Baldwin, United States congresswoman from Wisconsin
Evan Bayh, United States Senator from Indiana and former governor of Indiana
Sharon Sayles Belton, mayor of Minneapolis
Yvonne Braithwaite Burke, member of the Los Angeles County Board of Supervisors
Elizabeth Birch, executive director of the Human Rights Campaign
Earl Blumenauer, United States congressman from Oregon
Bill Bradley, former United States Senator from New Jersey and candidate for the 2000 Democratic presidential nomination
Bob Butterworth, Florida attorney general
Tom Carper, governor of Delaware and Democratic nominee for United States Senate in Delaware
Suzan Johnson Cook, reverend
Tom Daschle, United States Senate minority leader
Jim Davis, United States congressman from Florida
Howard Dean, governor of Vermont
Norman Dicks, United States congressman from California
Jim Doyle, attorney general of Wisconsin
John Edwards, United States Senator from North Carolina
María Elena Durazo, trade union activist
Dick Durbin, United States senator from Illinois
C. Jack Ellis, mayor of Macon, Georgia
Martha Escutia, California state senator
Russ Feingold, United States Senator from Wisconsin
Harold Ford Jr., United States congressman from Tennessee keynote speaker
Jane Harman, former United States congresswoman from California and nominee for United States congress from California
Maher Hathout (invocation)
James Hunt Jr., governor of North Carolina
Jay Inslee, United States congressman from Washington
Daniel Inouye, United States Senator from Hawaii
Jesse Jackson, president and CEO of Rainbow/PUSH, former United States shadow senator from the District of Columbia; candidate for the 1984 and 1988 Democratic presidential nominations
Eddie Bernice Johnson, United States congressman from Texas
Patty Judge, Secretary of agriculture of Iowa
Robert F. Kennedy Jr., attorney
Ted Kennedy, United States senator from Massachusetts
Nita Lowey, United States congresswoman from New York
Martin Meehan, United States congressman from Massachusetts
Thomas Menino, mayor of Boston
Terry McAuliffe, chair of the convention
Gerald McEntee, president of AFSCME
Kate Michelman, president of NARAL
Tom Miller, attorney general of Iowa
Norman Mineta, United States secretary of commerce
Eleanor Holmes Norton, non-voting delegate to the United States House of Representatives
Grace Napolitano, United States congresswoman from California
Janet Napolitano, attorney general of Arizona
Edward James Olmos, actor
Bill Purcell, mayor of Nashville
Jack Reed, United States Senator from Rhode Island
Charles Rangel, United States congressman from New York
Ed Rendell, general chair of the Democratic National Committee and former mayor of Philadelphia
Hans Reimer, founder of the 2030 Center
Tim Roemer, United States congressman from Indiana
Pedro Rossello, governor of Puerto Rico
Lucille Roybal-Allard, United States congresswoman from California
Raymond G. Sanchez, speaker of the New Mexico House of Representatives
Caroline Kennedy Schlossberg, daughter of former president John F. Kennedy
Karen Thurman, United States congresswoman from Florida
Kathleen Kennedy Townsend, lieutenant governor of Maryland
Richard Trumka, secretary-treasurer of the AFL–CIO
David Wu, United States congressman from Oregon

Day 3
Archbishop Demetrios of America (invocation)
Tom Allen, United States congressman from Maine
Thurbert Baker, attorney general of Georgia
Shelley Berkley, United States congresswoman from Nevada
Sanford Bishop, United States congressman from Georgia
Elaine Bloom, former speaker pro tempore of the Florida House of Representatives; nominee for United States Senate in Florida
Leonard Boswell, United States congressman from Iowa
Lee Brown, mayor of Houston
Raymond Buckley, member of the New Hampshire House of Representatives
Troy D. Brown, nominee for United States Senate in Mississippi
Willie Brown, mayor of San Francisco and former speaker of the California Assembly
Mel Carnahan, governor of Missouri and Democratic nominee for United States Senate in Missouri
Bob Chase, president of the National Education Association
Max Cleland, United States Senator from Georgia
Jim Clyburn, United States congressman from South Carolina
John Corzine, candidate for the United States Senate in New Jersey
Gray Davis, governor of California
Lois DeBerry, speaker pro tempore of the Tennessee General Assembly (nominating speech for Al Gore)
Rosa DeLauro, United States congresswoman from Connecticut
Nelson Diaz, former judge of the Philadelphia Court of Common Pleas
Al Edwards, member of the Texas House of Representatives
Lane Evans, United States congressman from Illinois
Jack Ford, Democratic leader of the Ohio House of Representatives
Wayne Ford, member of the Iowa House of Representatives
Karen Freeman-Wilson, Indiana attorney general
Martin Frost, United States congressman from Texas
Domingo Garcia, member of the Texas House of Representatives
Sam Gejdenson, United States congressman from Connecticut
Dick Gephardt, minority leader of the United States House of Representatives
Parris Glendening, governor of Maryland
Charlie Gonzalez, United States congressman from Texas
Bart Gordon, United States congressman from Tennessee
Christine Gregoire, attorney general of Washington
Clarence Harmon, mayor of St. Louis
Dario Herrera, member of the Clark County Commission and former member of the Nevada Assembly
Robert Hertzberg, speaker of the California State Assembly
Joe Hoeffel, United States congressman from Pennsylvania
Rush Holt, United States congressman from California
Mike Honda, member of the California State Assembly and candidate for the United States House of Representatives
William J. Jefferson, United States congressman from Louisiana
Stephanie Tubbs Jones, United States congresswoman from Ohio
Tommy Lee Jones, actor (nominating speech for Al Gore)
Eleanor Jordan, member of the Kentucky General Assembly and candidate for the United States House of Representatives
Kwame Kilpatrick, Democratic floor leader of the Michigan House of Representatives
Ron Klink, United States congressman from Pennsylvania and candidate for the United States Senate in Pennsylvania
John Lewis, United States congressman from Georgia
Hadassah Lieberman, spouse of vice presidential nominee (introduction for VP nomination acceptance speech)
Joe Lieberman, vice presidential nominee (VP nomination acceptance speech)
Zoe Lofgren, United States congresswoman from California
Ellen Malcolm, president of EMILY's List
Carolyn Maloney, United States congresswoman from New York
Carrie Meek, United States congresswoman from Florida
Bob Menendez, United States congressman from New Jersey
Juanita Millender-McDonald, United States congresswoman from California
Jonathan Miller, Kentucky state treasurer
Renee Mullins, daughter of James Byrd Jr.
Carolyn Maloney, United States congresswoman from New York
Robert Matsui, United States congressman from California
H. Carl McCall, New York state comptroller
Nancy Pelosi, United States congresswoman from California
Roberto Ramirez, member of the New York Assembly
John D. Rockefeller, United States Senator from West Virginia
Chuck Robb, United States Senator from Virginia
Robert Rubin, former United States secretary of the treasury
Chuck Schumer, United States Senator from New York
Dennis Shepard and Judy Shepard, parents of Matthew Shepard
Karenna Gore Schiff, daughter of the presidential nominee (nominating speech for Al Gore)
Jimmy Smits, actor
Andy Stern, president of the Service Employees International Union
John F. Street, mayor of Philadelphia
Bart Stupak, United States congressman from Michigan
John Sweeney, president of the AFL–CIO
John S. Tanner, United States congressman from Tennessee
Antonio Villaraigosa, former speaker of the California State Assembly

Day 4
Michela Alioto, 1998 nominee for Secretary of state of California 
Yvonne Atkinson-Gates, chair of the Clark County Commission
Joe Biden, United States senator from Delaware and candidate for the 1988 Democratic presidential nomination, and eventual 46th President of the United States
David Bonior, United States House of Representatives Democratic Whip

John Breaux, United States Senator from Louisiana
Willie Brown, mayor of San Francisco and former speaker of the California Assembly
Cruz Bustamante, lieutenant governor of California
Lois Capps, United States congresswoman from California
Bob Casey Jr., Pennsylvania auditor general
John Conyers, United States congressman from Michigan
Andrew Cuomo, United States Secretary of Housing and Urban Development
Susan Davis, candidate for United States House of Representatives in California
Jane Dixon, bishop of the Episcopal Church in the United States of America
Chris Dodd, United States Senator from Connecticut
Cal Dooley, United States congressman from California
Byron Dorgon, United States Senator from North Dakota
Sandra Feldman, president of the American Federation of Teachers
Mario Gallegos Jr., Texas state senator
Dan Glickman, United States Secretary of Agriculture
Al Gore, presidential nominee (presidential nomination acceptance speech)
Kristin Gore, daughter of presidential nominee
Tipper Gore, wife of presidential nominee
Jennifer Granholm, candidate for Michigan attorney general
Barney Frank, United States congressman from Massachusetts
David Halberstam, journalist
Tom Harkin, United States senator from Iowa and candidate for the 1992 Democratic presidential nomination
Tony P. Hall, United States congressman from Ohio
Thelma Harper, Tennessee state senator
Frank W. Hunger, former United States assistant attorney general for the civil division and uncle of the presidential nominee
Sheila Kuehl, member of the California State Assembly
Martin Luther King III, president of the Southern Christian Leadership Conference
Mark Lawrence, president of the Maine Senate and nominee for United States Senate in Maine
Sheila Jackson Lee, United States congresswoman from Texas
Pat Leahy, United States Senator from Vermont
Susan Bass Levin, candidate for United States House of Representatives in New Jersey
Bill Luther, United States congressman from Minnesota
Patricia Madrid, attorney general of New Mexico
Jim Maloney, United States congressman from Connecticut
Jack Markell, Delaware state treasurer
Frank Mascara, United States congressman from Pennsylvania
Sue Masten, president of the National Council of American Indians
Vashti Murphy McKenzie, African Methodist Episcopal Church bishop (invocation)
Kendrick Meek, Florida state senator
Kweisi Mfume, president of the NAACP and former United States congressman from Maryland
Harry Reid, United States Senate Democratic Whip
Barbara Mikulski, United States Senator from Maryland
Jan Schakowsky, United States congresswoman from Illinois
Brian Schweitzer, candidate for United States Senate in Montana
Louise Slaughter, United States congresswoman from New York
Hilda Solis, California state senator and candidate for the United States House of Representatives from California
John Spratt, United States congressman from South Carolina
Susan Turnbull, chair of the Democratic National Committee women's caucus
Robert A. Underwood, non-voting delegate to the United States House of Representatives from Guam
Nydia Velazquez, United States congresswoman from New York
Tom Vilsack, governor of Iowa
Maxine Waters, United States congresswoman from California

Notable performers

Day 1
Craig Bierko and the Broadway cast of The Music Man: "76 Trombones"
Melissa Etheridge: "America the Beautiful"

Day 2
Pat Morita: "The Star-Spangled Banner"
Los Lobos
Jenny Powers: "The Star-Spangled Banner"
Luther Vandross, "America...The Dream Goes On"

Day 3
Mary Chapin Carpenter: "Why Walk When You Can Fly"
Plus One: "The Star-Spangled Banner" and "America the Beautiful"
Stevie Wonder and Diane Schuur: "The Star-Spangled Banner"

Day 4
Boyz II Men: "The Star-Spangled Banner"
Christie Brinkley: "Pledge of Allegiance"
Phil Driscoll: "Battle Hymn of the Republic"
Mark O'Connor, "Orange Blossom Special"

Summaries of key speeches

Bill Bradley

Bill Clinton 

Outgoing president Bill Clinton spoke on the convention's first night. Clinton noted his administration's accomplishments and praised Gore, saying that "You gave me that chance to turn those ideas and values into action, after I made one of the best decisions of my life: asking Al Gore to be my partner."

Hillary Clinton

Gray Davis 

Governor of California Gray Davis delivered remarks on both the first and third days of the convention.

His first speech was a welcoming speech on behalf of the host state of the convention. In it, he harkened back to the 1960 Democratic National Convention held in Los Angeles 40 years earlier, which nominated John F. Kennedy for president, and declared, "we remain the new frontier President Kennedy envisioned here. And our party still embodies the spirit of service and duty he called to life.". He highlighted a number of values and issues that he argued were promoted by Democratic Party.

Chris Dodd

Harold Ford Jr. 

The keynote speaker of the convention was Congressman Harold Ford Jr. of Tennessee. Ford spoke on the second night of the convention.

Ford, who, at 30, was at the time the youngest member of Congress, directed his speech towards younger voters, saying, "I also stand here representing a new generation, a generation committed to those ideals and inspired by an unshakable confidence in our future."

Dick Gephardt 

Minority leader of the United States House of Representatives Dick Gephardt of Missouri spoke on the convention's third night. In his speech, he criticized the Republican majority in both chambers of the United States Congress for. He characterized them as unwilling to pass a patients' bill of rights, a Medicare prescription benefit, campaign reform, and gun safety measures.

Al Gore

Al Gore delivered his presidential nomination acceptance speech on the final night of the convention.

Gore's acceptance speech focused on the future saying, "We're entering a new time, we're electing a new president, and I stand here tonight as my own man. I want you to know me for who I truly am." He mentioned President Clinton only once near the beginning of the speech. The speech was focused on issues: "I'm here to talk seriously about the issues. I believe people deserve to know specifically what a candidate proposes to do. I intend to tell you tonight. You ought to be able to know, and then judge for yourself."

Tipper Gore

Jesse Jackson

Jesse Jackson, founder, president and CEO of the Rainbow/Push Coalition; former United States shadow senator from the District of Columbia; and candidate for the 1984 and 1988 Democratic presidential nominations, spoke on the convention's second evening.

In his speech, Jackson criticized the Republican convention held two weeks earlier, commenting, "Two weeks ago, in Philadelphia, the nation was treated to a stage show - smoke, mirrors, hired acts that Republicans called inclusion. That was the inclusion illusion. In Philadelphia, diversity ended on the stage. They could not mention the words Africa, Appalachia, or AIDS once. So it is good to be here in Los Angeles, to look over this great assembly and see the real deal - the quilt of many patches that is America."

Jackson strongly praised the selection of Lieberman as Gore's running mate, while criticizing Republican vice presidential nominee Dick Cheney.

Jackson named a number of issues where he argued Gore and Lieberman held the moral high ground over Bush and Cheney.

Jackson characterized the Republicans as a "grizzly old team" seeking to give tax breaks to the rich. He warned voters that a Bush victory would not just bring Bush to power, but also a "team" comprised Republicans such as Dick Armey, Bob Barr, Tom DeLay, Jesse Helms, and Strom Thurmond. Jackson urged America to, "stay out of the Bushes", a phrase which the audience began chanting.

Tommy Lee Jones 

Actor Tommy Lee Jones, who had been college roommates with Al Gore, delivered a nominating speech for Gore on the convention's third night. Jones recounted his friendship with Gore, and hailed Gore's character.

Ted Kennedy

Hadassah Lieberman

Hadassah Lieberman, the wife of the vice presidential nominee, delivered an introduction before her Husband's acceptance speech on the convention's third night.

Joe Lieberman

Lieberman delivered his vice presidential nomination acceptance speech on the third night of the convention, despite the fact that he would not be formally nominated until the next day.

Vice-presidential nominee Lieberman invoked the spirit of John F. Kennedy in his speech, saying: "Tonight, I believe that the next frontier isn't just in front of us, but inside of us--to overcome the differences that are still between us, to break down the barriers that remain and to help every American claim the possibilities of their own lives."

Karenna Gore Schiff

Caroline Kennedy Schlossberg

Protests

Large scale, sometimes violent protests took place outside of the Staples Center as well as throughout downtown Los Angeles. Protest groups ranged from anti-abortion supporters, to homeless activists, to anti-globalization protestors, and anarchists. Out of increased fear after the surprise mass-protests at the 1999 "Battle for Seattle" WTO protests, media coverage and LAPD concern were heightened for the event.

Concerns were further raised when violent riots also broke out after the Los Angeles Lakers won the 2000 National Basketball Association Championship only a few months before the convention. Originally, a "Protest Zone" was designated a city block away from the Staples Center, but a court order forced the zone moved immediately adjacent to the arena, in a parking lot.

The protests became violent during the first evening of the convention, and many different protests, some orderly, some violent, took place over the full four days of the convention. There were numerous arrests, injuries and property damage, but the protests were less than originally feared. The band Rage Against the Machine played outside the convention showing its disdain of the policies being promoted inside the building.

After the convention 
In November, Al Gore narrowly lost to Texas Governor George W. Bush in the general election having won the popular vote but losing the electoral vote in a decision handed down more than a month after the election by the Supreme Court. This decision read as follows: "Noting that the Equal Protection clause guarantees individuals that their ballots cannot be devalued by 'later arbitrary and disparate treatment,' the per curiam opinion held 7–2 that the Florida Supreme Court's scheme for recounting ballots was unconstitutional. Even if the recount was fair in theory, it was unfair in practice. The record suggested that different standards were applied from ballot to ballot, precinct to precinct, and county to county. Because of those and other procedural difficulties, the court held, 5 to 4, that no constitutional recount could be fashioned in the time remaining".

See also
 2000 Green National Convention
 2000 Libertarian National Convention
 2000 Republican National Convention
 2000 Democratic Party presidential primaries
 2000 United States presidential election
 History of the United States Democratic Party
 List of Democratic National Conventions
 United States presidential nominating convention
 Al Gore 2000 presidential campaign

References

External links
 Democratic Party Platform of 2000 at The American Presidency Project
 Gore Nomination Acceptance Speech for President at DNC (transcript) at The American Presidency Project
 Video of Gore nomination acceptance speech for President at DNC (via YouTube)
 Audio of Gore nomination acceptance speech for President at DNC
 Video of Lieberman nomination acceptance speech for Vice President at DNC (via YouTube)
 Audio of Lieberman nomination acceptance speech for Vice President at DNC
 Transcript of Lieberman nomination acceptance speech for Vice President at DNC
 Video (with audio) of Ford Keynote Address at DNC
 Transcript of Ford Keynote Address at DNC

 
Democratic National Conventions
Democratic National Convention
2000 in Los Angeles
Conventions in Los Angeles
Political conventions in California
California Democratic Party
Democratic National Convention, 2000
Al Gore 2000 presidential campaign
Democratic National Convention 2000
2000 conferences
August 2000 events in the United States
Joe Lieberman